These are the New Territories West results of the 2008 Hong Kong legislative election. The election was held on 7 September 2008 and all 8 seats in New Territories West, which consists of Tsuen Wan District, Tuen Mun District, Yuen Long District, Kwai Tsing District and Islands District, were contested. All the incumbents were elected except for Selina Chow of the Liberal Party, which was succeeded by Wong Kwok-hing of the Hong Kong Federation of Trade Unions who contested in the constituency for the first time.

Overall results
Before election:

Change in composition:

Candidates list

See also
Legislative Council of Hong Kong
Hong Kong legislative elections
2008 Hong Kong legislative election

References

Elections in Hong Kong
2008 Hong Kong legislative election